Home and Away  is a British  television drama series which aired in seven parts on ITV in 1972.

Cast
 Rosalind Ayres as Grace
 Tony Melody as Godfrey
 Gillian Raine as  Brenda
 George Sewell as Winslow Scott
 Stephen Temperley as Edward
 Bernard Wrigley as Office Clerk

References

Bibliography
 Paul Cornell, Martin Day & Keith Topping. The Guinness Book of Classic British TV. Guinness, 1996.

External links
 

ITV television dramas
1972 British television series debuts
1972 British television series endings
English-language television shows